Mielparque (メルパルク Meruparuku) is a Japanese hotel chain.

Mielparque operates hotels throughout Honshū, Shikoku, and Kyūshū.

References

External links
 Mielparque (English)
 Mielparque (Japanese)

Hospitality companies of Japan
Hotel chains in Japan